The 1951–52 St. John's Redmen basketball team represented St. John's University during the 1951–52 NCAA men's basketball season. The team was coached by Frank McGuire in his fifth year at the school. St. John's home games are played at DeGray Gymnasium in Brooklyn, New York and Madison Square Garden and the team is a member of the Metropolitan New York Conference.

Roster

NCAA basketball tournament
East
St. John's 60, NC State 49
St. John's 64, Kentucky 57
Final Four
St. John's 61, Illinois 59
Kansas 80, St. John's 63

Schedule and results

|-
!colspan=9 style="background:#FF0000; color:#FFFFFF;"| Regular Season

|-
!colspan=9 style="background:#FF0000; color:#FFFFFF;"| National Invitation Tournament

|-
!colspan=9 style="background:#FF0000; color:#FFFFFF;"| NCAA tournament

|-
!colspan=9 style="background:#FF0000; color:#FFFFFF;"| Olympics

NBA draft

References

St. John's Red Storm men's basketball seasons
St. John's
NCAA Division I men's basketball tournament Final Four seasons
St. John's
St John
St John